Marócsa is a village in Baranya county, Hungary.

Gallery

Baranya (region)
History of Baranya (region)
Populated places in Baranya County